Select is the second studio album by English pop singer Kim Wilde, released on 10 May 1982 by RAK Records. The album was not released in North America, however the singles were.

Overview
The first single from this album, "Cambodia", was released in November 1981 and signalled a different sound from the Wilde camp, with an electronic and synth sound different from the rock sound of her previous studio album. The songs were again written by Marty and Ricky Wilde and produced by Ricky Wilde. The lyrics of the songs were similar to the first album: the second single "View from a Bridge" and the album track "Wendy Sadd" seemed to be about suicide, "Chaos at the Airport" described a nightmare about flying and "Ego" was quite the opposite of a love song. "Can You Come Over" was recorded at the Wilde's home. The cover image was a photograph from Gered Mankowitz.

This sequel to Wilde's debut studio album topped the charts in a host of European countries and reached number 8 in Australia, although it did not surpass the success of its predecessor.

Select has been re-released twice on CD, once in 2009 as a remastered and expanded edition and once in 2020 as a deluxe edition, including one unreleased track, a second CD with new remixes and a DVD. The original album was re-released on vinyl in 2020, including the original track list. Both 2020 CD and LP editions include new remasters.

Critical reception

Select was initially received less favourably than Wilde's debut studio album. Stephen Waldon of Juke complimented Wilde's vocals and Marty and Ricky's songwriting, despite finding the production too "stylised in the current pop mode". He described "Just a Feeling" as "a beauty" and deemed "Cambodia" the album's best song. Elly McDonald from The Record critiqued Wilde's voice as "amazingly vacant" but praised Marty and Ricky for having "a wonderful sense of dramatic tension and an ear for soap operas within three verses".

Track listing
All songs written by Marty Wilde and Ricky Wilde, except where indicated

Side one
 "Ego" – 4:11
 "Words Fell Down" – 3:31
 "Action City" – 3:25
 "View from a Bridge" – 3:32
 "Just a Feeling" – 4:12

Side two
 "Chaos at the Airport" – 3:20
 "Take Me Tonight" – 3:56
 "Can You Come Over" – 3:35
 "Wendy Sadd" – 3:49
 "Cambodia + Reprise" – 7:13

Bonus tracks (2009 remastered CD edition)
 "Watching for Shapes" ("Cambodia" B-side) – 3:42
 "Cambodia" (Single Version) – 3:57
 "Child Come Away" – 4:05
 "Just Another Guy" ("Child Come Away" B-side) – 3:19
 "Bitter Is Better" (Masami Tsuchiya, Bill Crunchfield) – 3:43

Track list (2020 Deluxe Edition)
CD1
 "Ego"
 "Words fell down"
 "Action City"
 "View from a Bridge"
 "Just a Feeling"
 "Chaos at the Airport"
 "Take Me Tonight"
 "Can You Come Over"
 "Wendy Sadd"
 "Cambodia"
 "Reprise"
 "Child Come Away"
 "Bitter Is Better"
 "He Will Be There"
 "Watching for Shapes"
 "Just Another Guy"
 "Bitter Is Better" (Instrumental)

CD2
 "Ego" (Rough Mix)
 "Words Fell Down" (Original Mix)
 "Action City" (Instrumental Demo)
 "Just a Feeling" (Rough Mix)
 "Chaos at the Airport" (Rough Mix)
 "Take Me Tonight" (Original Mix)
 "Cambodia" (Matt Pop Extended Version)
 "View from a Bridge" (Luke Mornay Remix)
 "Child Come Away" (Matt Pop Remix)
 "Cambodia" (Luke Mornay Urbantronik Mix)
 "View from a Bridge" (Raw Remix)
 "Child Come Away" (Matt Pop Instrumental)
 "Cambodia" (Matt Pop Instrumental)
 "View from a Bridge" (Luke Mornay Instrumental)
 "Cambodia" (Luke Mornay Urbantronik Instrumental)

DVD
The Videos
 "Cambodia"
 "View from a Bridge"
 "Child Come Away"

Kim at the BBC
 "Cambodia" (On Top of the Pops)
 "View from a Bridge" (On Top of the Pops)
 "View from a Bridge" (On Nationwide Special: The British Rock & Pop Wards)

Charts

Weekly charts

Year-end charts

Certifications and sales

References

External links
 

1982 albums
Kim Wilde albums
Rak Records albums
New wave albums by English artists